Belinski or Belinsky (feminine: Belinskaya) is a Russian-language surname. Its Polish-language counterpart is Bieliński.

The surname may refer to:
Bo Belinsky (1936–2001), American baseball player
Bruno Bjelinski (1909–1992), Croatian composer
Fabián Bielinsky (1959–2006), Argentine film director
Viktoria Milvidskaia Belinsky (born 1967), Russian tennis player 
Vissarion Belinsky (1811–1848), Russian literary critic
Vitali Belinski (Vitaly Belinsky) (born 1989), Belarusian ice hockey player
Vladimir Belinski (Belinsky) (born 1941), Russian theoretical physicist

Fictional characters
Nikolai Belinski, a character from the Call of Duty: Black Ops video game
Tania Belinsky, Soviet neurosurgeon, a Red Guardian in the Marvel Comics universe

Russian-language surnames

ru:Белинский (значения)